Saman Aslam is the first and the youngest female graphologist and graphotherapist in Pakistan. Graphology is the analysis of handwriting to assess personality traits and health issues of the writer. Graphology is pseudoscience.

Career 
Aslam was born and raised in Saudi Arabia, and began working at 15. She is the first foreign graphologist in that country as well as being the only bilingual (English and Arabic) one. As of November 2020, she resides in Riyadh and maintains an Instagram account that offers free handwriting analysis. 

Aslam has described her interest in graphology as based on her experience learning Arabic writing, and having Arabic graphologists describe some of her personality traits based on her handwriting. She went on to study graphology of English handwriting in addition to Arabic, and obtained certifications from Cambridge, London. 

Aslam insists on a distinction between graphology and spiritual practices, saying graphology does not predict the future. She has advised people thinking of taking up graphology to "do it sincerely because your words are going to engrave someone’s soul." She has also explained that there is more than handwriting analysis to create a better understanding herself and those around her, but also therapies that can be customized to develop new handwriting patterns.

References 

Living people
Pakistani women graphologists
People from Riyadh
Year of birth missing (living people)